Adrian Grodecki (died on 1658) was a Roman Catholic prelate who served as  Auxiliary Bishop of Gniezno (1644–1658).

Biography
On 12 December 1644, Adrian Grodecki was appointed during the papacy of Pope Innocent X as Auxiliary Bishop of Gniezno and Titular Bishop of Teodosia. on 25 July 1645 he was consecrated bishop. While bishop, he was the principal co-consecrator of Maciej Marian Kurski, Bishop of Bacău (1651).

References

External links and additional sources
 (for Chronology of Bishops) 
 (for Chronology of Bishops) 

17th-century Roman Catholic bishops in the Polish–Lithuanian Commonwealth
Bishops appointed by Pope Innocent X
1658 deaths